Maasland (population: 6,844) is a town in the western Netherlands, in the province of South Holland. It lies in the municipality (gemeente) of Midden-Delfland and covers an area of 24.42 km2 (of which 0.64 km2 water).

History
From approximately 700, the area was populated, presumably by Frisians. It was first the royal domain, and later went to the local counts. The first signs of a community at the current location of the town started back in 985 when the area was given by the Emperor Otto III to Graaf Dirk II and a church was built. After severe floodings during the 12th century, the Maasdijk was rebuilt and the town centre relocated to its current site. In 1241 Graaf Willem II let the German Teutonic Knights draw on the territory of Maasland. Furthermore, in 1243 a nobleman, Diederik van Coldenhove, gave all his property in Oude Campspolder, north of the current town center, to the Order, and a commandery was established there to manage the properties of the Order in Maasland.

In 1450 the 'Poldermolen' (translation: Poldermill) was built in Maasland.

During the war between Spain and the Netherlands a huge area of the Netherlands was flooded which was part of the strategy of Willem van Oranje. In 1574, these floodings affected Maasland, and once again the town was flooded. It took a couple of years before the town was rebuilt and in 1614 part of the town Maasland (which included the Maeslandsluys) gained independency and is known as Maassluis.

Until the new townhall was built in 1874 meetings of the city council meetings were held in the tavern 'de Pynas'.

In the late 20th century the town of Maasland and its surrounding communities were governed as the municipality (gemeente) of Maasland, with most governmental functions based in the town.

In 2004, the town of Maasland became part of the municipality (gemeente) of Midden-Delfland upon the merger of the municipality of Maasland and the municipality of Schipluiden.

Places of interest 
 The 'Oude Kerk' (translation: Old Church (founded circa 1400), burned down during the celebrations for freedom after World War II. Restored in 1954.
 Tavern 'de Pynas', which is still a café.
 Museum 'de Schilpen', an eighty-year-old grocery store in its original state. Now a museum.
 The 'Two Mills'

In the news 
 According to Elsevier (a Dutch magazine) Maasland was the wealthiest town in the Netherlands during 2004.
 In August 2004 the KNMI (Dutch institute for Weather forecasting) reported an extreme high level of rainfall in the Netherlands. In the month August 325mm of rainfall was registered by the weatherstation in Maasland, the highest since the KNMI started measuring the rainfall in 1900.

Famous people from Maasland
 Michiel Smit, far-right politician

References

External links
Official website
Maasland and Midden-Delfland Mooi Dichtbij portal

Municipalities of the Netherlands disestablished in 2004
Populated places in South Holland
Former municipalities of South Holland
Midden-Delfland